Kate Armstrong is a Canadian artist, writer and curator with a history of projects focusing on experimental literary practices, networks and public space.

Biography
Armstrong is a Canadian-born artist, writer, and curator. She holds a Bachelor of Arts degree from Queen's University in Kingston, Ontario. She received a master of philosophy in humanities degree from Memorial University in St. John's, Newfoundland. After gaining her master's degree from Memorial University in her early twenties, she began her current career path in the arts. The main focus of her work is to explore the relationship between art and technology.

Armstrong later moved to Vancouver, British Columbia to begin her career. She currently continues to reside in Vancouver.

Career
Armstrong's network art projects include PING (2003), Grafik Dynamo (2005), Why Some Dolls Are Bad (2007), and Path (2008).

Armstrong publishes on issues in contemporary art and has a book, Crisis and Repetition: Essays on Art and Culture (Michigan State University Press, 2002).

She founded Upgrade Vancouver in 2003 and has produced over 100 events in the field of art and technology in Vancouver, as well as many international events and exhibitions in connection with Upgrade International, a network operating in 30 cities worldwide. Upgrade Vancouver was the first node in Upgrade International outside New York City.

In 2006, 2007 and 2008 Armstrong convened ArtCamp, an unconference devoted to art, design and media.

In 2008 Armstrong commissioned and curated Tributaries and Text-Fed Streams, a work by J.R. Carpenter, which investigated the formal properties of RSS syndication as a literary form.

Armstrong taught at Emily Carr University of Art and Design. From 2005 to 2008 she taught at Simon Fraser University in the School of Interactive Arts and Technology in Surrey, British Columbia.  She lectured at Tate Britain in mid 2009.

Projects
 Space Video (2012) – Project that addresses ideas of exploration in inner and outer space. Commissioned by Turbulence.org
 Medium (2011) – Book compiling the results of an internet project of the same name
 Source Material Everywhere: A Remix (2011) – Book consisting of compiled Wikipedia entries for the terms "source", "material", and "everywhere"
 Path (2008) – 12 volume text generated book based on the physical movements of an anonymous individual in Montreal. An updated edition was released in 2012
 Why Some Dolls are Bad (2007) – Graphic novel generator that mixes images and original text to create a narrative
 Grafik Dynamo (2005-2008) – Net artwork that converted images from the internet into live-action comic strips from 2005 to 2008. Commissioned by Turbulence.org. Reviewed in Digital Humanities. Quarterly.
 Pattern Language (2005-2007) – Online system that attaches patterns of narrative to participants as they travel through Montreal
 The Problem of Other Minds (2006) – Voice-activated robotic sculpture that unspools a roll of paper when it recognizes keywords
 IN[]EX (2006) – Project in which thousands of wooden blocks with embedded technology are released in the city for public engagement
 PING (2003) – Telephone menu system that directs participants through the city. Reviewed in Beyond the Screen, 2010

Publications and essays
 Chapter 28. A Collective Imaginary: A Published Conversation, with Kate Armstrong Electronic Literature as Digital Humanities: Contexts, Forms, and Practices
 A Manual for the Discrete and the Continuous, Fillip, Issue 11 (2010)
 Visual Geographies, Blackflash Magazine (2010)
 Yo Dawg, I Hear You Like Culture So I Put Some Culture in Your Culture, Granville Magazine (2009)
 Robots in the Garden, Catalogue essay, Second Site Collective (2009)
 Data and Narrative: Location Aware Fiction, trAce Online Writing Centre, (2003)
 Crisis & Repetition: Essays on Art and Culture,(2002)

See also

List of electronic literature authors, critics, and works
Digital poetry
E-book#History
Electronic literature
Hypertext fiction
Interactive fiction
Literatronica

References

Living people
Year of birth missing (living people)
Canadian multimedia artists
Canadian women artists
Queen's University at Kingston alumni
Artists from Vancouver
Memorial University of Newfoundland alumni
University of Montpellier alumni
Writers from Vancouver
Canadian women curators
Electronic literature writers